Mahonia is a genus of approximately 70 species of evergreen shrubs and, rarely, small trees in the family Berberidaceae, native to eastern Asia, the Himalaya, North and Central America. They are closely related to the genus Berberis and botanists disagree on whether to recognize a separate Mahonia.  Many botanists prefer to classify Mahonia as a part of Berberis because several species in both genera are able to hybridize, and because there are no consistent morphological differences between the two groups other than the leaf pinnation (Berberis sensu stricto appear to have simple leaves, but these are in reality compound with a single leaflet and are termed "unifoliolate"; additionally their branched spines are modified compound leaves). However, recent DNA-based phylogenetic studies retain the two separate genera, by clarifying that unifoliolate-leaved Berberis s.s. is derived from within a paraphyletic group of shrubs bearing imparipinnate evergreen leaves, which are then divided into three genera: Mahonia, Alloberberis (formerly Mahonia section Horridae), and Moranothamnus (formerly Berberis claireae); a broadly-circumscribed Berberis (that is, including Mahonia, Alloberberis, and Moranothamnus) would also be monophyletic.

Several species are popular garden shrubs, grown for their ornamental, often spiny, evergreen foliage, yellow (or rarely red) flowers in autumn, winter and early spring, and blue-black berries. The flowers are borne in terminal clusters or spreading racemes, and may be among the earliest flowers to appear in the growing season. The ripened fruits are acidic with a very sharp flavor. The plants contain berberine, a compound found in many Berberis and Mahonia species which causes vomiting, lowered blood pressure, reduced heart rate, lethargy, and other ill effects when consumed.

The genus name, Mahonia, derives from Bernard McMahon, one of the stewards of the plant collections from the Lewis and Clark Expedition. The type species of the genus is M. aquifolium.

Species
The following list includes all currently recognized species of the genus Mahonia as accepted by Tropicos, Missouri Botanical Garden as of February 2016, sorted alphabetically. For each, binomial name is followed by author citation.

Mahonia aquifolium  (Pursh) Nutt.
Mahonia bealei	(Fortune) Carrière
Mahonia bodinieri	Gagnep.
Mahonia bracteolata	Takeda
Mahonia breviracema	Y.S. Wang & P.G. Xiao
Mahonia cardiophylla	T.S. Ying & Boufford
Mahonia decipiens	C.K. Schneid.
Mahonia duclouxiana	Gagnep.
Mahonia eurybracteata	Fedde
Mahonia fordii	C.K. Schneid.
Mahonia fortunei	(Lindl.) Fedde
Mahonia fremontii      (Torr.) Fedde
Mahonia gracilipes	(Oliv.) Fedde
Mahonia hancockiana	Takeda
Mahonia imbricata	T.S. Ying & Boufford
Mahonia japonica	(Thunb.) DC.
Mahonia lancasteri	Colin
Mahonia leptodonta	Gagnep.
Mahonia longibracteata	Takeda
Mahonia leschenaultii  Wall. Ex. Wight & Arn. 
Mahonia miccia	Buch.-Ham. ex D. Don
Mahonia microphylla	T.S. Ying & G.R. Long
Mahonia monodens	J.Y.Wu, H.N.Qin & S.Z.He
Mahonia monyulensis	Ahrendt
Mahonia moranensis	(Schult. & Schult. f.) I.M. Johnstone
Mahonia napaulensis	DC.
Mahonia nervosa	(Pursh) Nutt.
Mahonia nitens	C.K. Schneid.
Mahonia oiwakensis	Hayata
Mahonia paucijuga	C.Y. Wu ex S.Y. Bao
Mahonia polyodonta	Fedde
Mahonia retinervis	P.G. Xiao & Y.S. Wang
Mahonia setosa	Gagnep.
Mahonia shenii	Chun
Mahonia sheridaniana	C.K. Schneid.
Mahonia subimbricata	Chun & F. Chun
Mahonia taronensis	Hand.-Mazz.
Mahonia tenuifolia	(Lindl.) Loudon ex Fedde
Mahonia tinctoria	(Terán & Berland.) I.M. Johnst.
Mahonia trifoliolata   (Moric.) Fedde
Mahonia volcanica	Standl. & Steyerm.

Diseases
Some Mahonia species serve as alternate hosts for the cereal disease stem rust (Puccinia graminis).

Gallery

References

External links 

 
Berberidaceae genera